Steve Craig (born March 13, 1951) is an American football player who played tight end in the National Football League from 1974 to 1978 and played in two Super Bowls.  He attended Garfield High School in Akron, Ohio, the same high school fellow NFL receiver Jim Lash attended, and Northwestern University. Craig was drafted in round three of the 1974 NFL Draft by the Minnesota Vikings. His five-year pro-career was spent with the Minnesota Vikings, during which time which he helped lead the team to Super Bowl IX and Super Bowl XI appearances.

Sources
Pro Football Reference
Database Football

1951 births
Living people
Sportspeople from Pennsylvania
Players of American football from Pennsylvania
American football wide receivers
Northwestern Wildcats football players
Minnesota Vikings players